Swing is a 2010 short film on anti-smoking directed by Abhinav Kamal. The film stars Amrita Neve in the female lead. DOP of the film has been carried out by Rajesh K.

The film received the Best Short Film Award in the festival Hollywood Boulevard conducted in connection with Liba Chrysalis, LIBA Chennai. The film was judged by Tamil film actor director Cheran. The film was produced by Ten Motion Arts.

References

External links

Abhinav Kamal at Institute of Management Technology

2010 films
2010s Hindi-language films